The initials AGB are used for:

 Advocate-General of Bengal
 Alexander Graham Bell, Scots Canadian American inventor
 Amerika-Gedenkbibliothek, a library in Berlin, Germany
 Amsterdam Gençler Birliği, a Dutch football team
 Association of Governing Boards of Universities and Colleges
 Asymptotic giant branch, a category of stars
 Attorney General of Bangladesh
 Attorney-General of Barbados
 Attorney-General of Belize
 Attorney General of Bermuda
 Attorney General of Bhutan
 Attorney General of Brunei
 Augsburg airport (IATA code AGB), Germany
 Gbo language (ISO 639-3 code AGB), Nigeria
 AGB, a product code prefix for the Game Boy Advance, its software and accessories
 Authentic Brands Group, an American brand management company